Arvid Gram Paulsen (born 4 January 1922 in Kristiania – 11 April 1963) was a Norwegian jazz musician (saxophone and trumpet) and composer.

Biography 
Gram Paulsen joined the orchestra at Oslo Swingklubb, and a new quartet with Lulle Kristoffersen and Pete Brown, under the leadership of Rowland Greenberg (1940). Beyond the 1940s, he joined the studio band of Syv Muntre, and various ensembles led by Svein Øvergaard, Rowland Greenberg, Willie Vieth, Jens Book-Jensen, Alf Søgaard, Pete Iwers and Finn Westbye. By Kurios record contributions may be mentioned that during World War II in conjunction with Alf Søgaard, contributed to Kari Diesen's album Problemet/Minorka (1942). In the 1950s he played within Pete Brown's Orchestra and led his own bands. Before he died he performed at the Moldejazz in 1962.

Honors 
1957: Buddyprisen

Discography 
2001: Portrait of a norwegian jazz artist – Arvid Gram Paulsen (Gemini Records)

References

External links 
Kristian Bergheim in memoriam by Jan Ditlev Hansen at NRK Jazz

1922 births
1963 deaths
Musicians from Oslo
Norwegian jazz saxophonists
Norwegian jazz composers
20th-century saxophonists
20th-century jazz composers